Hello Baby is a South Korean reality show where celebrities experience parenthood by raising children ages 5 and under. The main purpose is to see whether or not the celebrities make "good" parents.

The show aired for seven seasons, and has featured the groups Girls' Generation, SHINee, T-ara, Sistar, MBLAQ, B1A4 and Boyfriend. The first season, featuring Girls' Generation ran for 22 episodes, the seasons that followed all have 12 episodes each. It aired every Tuesday on KBS Joy.

Format
Each season, an idol group is given an infant or toddler to take care of, allowing them to experience parenthood to an extent. In the first season, Girls' Generation became 'mothers' to a nine-month-old boy. This was also the case for the boy band, Shinee, in the second season, though the child is two years old. In the third season, the girl group T-ara had to take care of three toddlers.

During the show's first three seasons, each group had to take care of the babies on their own, with some male celebrities acting as guest 'dads' in the first season. In the fourth season, Sistar became mothers to a baby boy, with Super Junior's Leeteuk as the father.

While all of the show's seasons have different concepts, they are still similar in ways such as the 'parents' being given missions and activities to do for the day with the children.

Seasons

Season 1: Girls' Generation's Hello Baby

Hello Baby's first season premiered on June 23, 2009. With 9 members, Girls' Generation became mothers to a nine-month-old boy named Cho Kyungsan. In the first episode, the members are given pointers about child care before they meet the baby. Each episode, guest fathers come on the show to help. At the end of the day, the dads pick 'best mom' who is given certain privileges and a 'worst mom' who is given some punishment, usually clean-up duties. They also occasionally play games and other activities. Girls' Generation's season was well-received, and its 5th episode ranked first among cable channels in its time slot. The show won 'Best Picture for Variety' at the 4th Korean Cable TV Awards in 2009. It ended with a total of 22 episodes on November 17, 2009.

Season 2: Shinee's Hello Baby

The second season started on January 19, 2010, and it features the boy band, SHINee, who have to take care of a 2-year-old toddler named Jung Yoo-geun. Like its previous season, the members have to deal with daily problems with having a child, such as preparing his meals, calming him down when he cries and doing other activities such as playing with him or teaching him new words. Because the members are not always with the child, they frequently sent him videos when they are away. In the final episode, Yoo-geun is given a time capsule by his 'fathers' which he would open when he turns 21. The season ended on April 6, 2010, with 12 episodes and a special episode.

Season 3: T-ara's Hello Baby

The third season, featuring girl group T-ara, started on November 16, 2010. For several months, the group act as mothers to three young brothers named Moon Mason, Moon Mavin and Moon Maden.

Season 4: Sistar and Leeteuk's Hello Baby
The fourth season started on September 2, 2011. It portrays the four Sistar members (Hyolyn, Bora, Soyou and Dasom) acting as mothers and Super Junior's Leeteuk as a father taking care of a baby named Kim Kyumin (Hangul: 김규민). The season finished broadcasting on November 18, 2011.

This season is similar to that of Leeteuk's Find Mom project. It shows the process of finding the favorite mom amongst the four Sistar members. Unlike the past seasons, it was the baby who was leading the shows, not the parents.

Season 5: MBLAQ's Hello Baby

The fifth season stars boy band MBLAQ as fathers of three multi-cultural children: Dayoung (Vietnamese-Korean), Lauren (Korean-Canadian) and Leo (French-Korean). The season began airing on January 19, 2012, and ended on April 5, 2012, with a total of 12 episodes. Like other seasons of Hello Baby, MBLAQ had to fulfill the task as parents to meet the needs of their kids.

Season 6: B1A4's Hello Baby
The sixth season features boy band B1A4 as fathers to a couple of countryside kids, Eunsol and Hyunwoo. The concept of this season is getting to know Seoul, since all the members of the band came from the countryside as well.

This season not only follows the established format of the care and growth of the children, but also unveils the members' journey into Seoul, since none of the members are from Seoul, as well as the children, who are not from Seoul either.

Season 7: Boyfriend's Hello Baby
The seventh season, starring Boyfriend, started on January 4, 2013. In this season, Boyfriend are fathers to two young toddlers.

References

South Korean reality television series
Korean Broadcasting System original programming
Korean-language television shows
2009 South Korean television series debuts
Parenting television series
2010s South Korean television series